The 1951 Oklahoma Sooners football team represented the University of Oklahoma during the 1951 college football season. They played their home games at Oklahoma Memorial Stadium and competed as members of the Big Seven Conference. They were coached by head coach Bud Wilkinson.

Schedule

Roster
 QB Eddie Crowder, Jr.
 G J. D. Roberts, So.
 HB Billy Vessels, Jr.
 T Jim Weatherall, Sr.
 E Carl Allison, Fr.

Rankings

Postseason

NFL Draft
The following players were drafted into the National Football League following the season.

References

Oklahoma
Oklahoma Sooners football seasons
Big Eight Conference football champion seasons
Oklahoma Sooners football